Gölgeli is a village in the Kâhta District, Adıyaman Province, Turkey. The village is populated by Kurds of the Reşwan tribe and had a population of 393 in 2021.

The hamlets of Atlı, Bulut and Sırakaya are attached to the village.

References

Villages in Kâhta District

Kurdish settlements in Adıyaman Province